Julien Charlet is a French curler and curling coach.

Teams

Record as a coach of national teams

References

External links

Living people

Sportspeople from Haute-Savoie
French male curlers
French curling coaches
Year of birth missing (living people)